Keats and His Nightingale: A Blind Date is a 1985 American short documentary film directed by Jim Wolpaw. It was nominated for an Academy Award for Best Documentary Short.

References

External links

1985 films
1985 documentary films
1985 short films
American short documentary films
1980s short documentary films
American independent films
Documentary films about poets
1985 independent films
1980s English-language films
1980s American films